Krasny Mayak is a rural locality (a village) in Muraptalovsky Selsoviet, Kuyurgazinsky District, Bashkortostan, Russia. The population was 169 as of 2010. There is 1 street.

Geography 
Krasny Mayak is located 44 km south of Yermolayevo (the district's administrative centre) by road. Kyzyl-Mayak is the nearest rural locality.

References 

Rural localities in Kuyurgazinsky District